Chamroen Songkitrat (Thai: จำเริญ ทรงกิตรัตน์), born as Samroeng Srimadi, was a Thai boxer and policeman. Songkitrat was a champion Muay Thai fighter in Thailand with over 50 fights before becoming an orthodox boxer. He made two unsuccessful attempts at the NBA World Bantamweight title to Jimmy Carruthers and Robert Cohen in May and September 1954, both to audiences over 60,000. He is considered the first Thai boxer to have the opportunity to challenge for a World Champion, his fight with Jimmy Carruthers on May 2, 1954 was also the first world-class professional boxing event that took place in Thailand.

Career 
On December 30, 1949, Songkitrat debuted against Mok Kai Khoon in the Happy World Arena, Singapore.

The first time he challenged the World Champion was against Australian Jimmy Carruthers on May 2, 1954, at the National Stadium (Suphachalasai Stadium). More than 60,000 spectators attended, including King Bhumibol and Queen Sirikit of Thailand Songkitrat was sponsored partly by the Royal Thai Police Department. The stadium was open-roofed, and as it was monsoon season and raining, both competitors fought barefoot and were forced to dodge falling light globes as they exploded from gusts of wind. This is the first recorded match in modern world boxing history where boxers removed their boots.

On September 19, 1954, Songkitrat challenged World Champion Robert Cohen at the National Stadium (Suphachalasai Stadium). His nose was broken during the seventh round, but he fought on, only to lose through points after 15 rounds.

On March 9, 1955, he fought Raúl Macías at Cow Palace, in California, and lost.

After retiring from boxing, he continued to work as a police officer. Upon quitting the force, Songkitrat spent time working in France before returning to Bangkok. He opened a business in Chiang Mai, but after becoming paralyzed he returned to Bangkok. He died there on August 29, 2003, at the age of 74.

Professional boxing record

References

External links 
 

Chamroen Songkitrat
Chamroen Songkitrat
Chamroen Songkitrat
1928 births
2003 deaths
Bantamweight boxers
Featherweight boxers
Lightweight boxers
Chamroen Songkitrat